East Wenona was a village in Osage Township, LaSalle County, Illinois, United States. East Winona was located on the eastern border of the city of Wenona in Marshall County. The village was incorporated on May 7, 1908, and had a population of 367 in 1910 and 333 in 1920. The village disincorporated between 1925 and 1927. East Wenona was noted on the 1940 Census map of LaSalle County.

References

Populated places in LaSalle County, Illinois
Former populated places in Illinois
Populated places established in 1908
1908 establishments in Illinois
Former municipalities in Illinois